Comoros national basketball team represents the Comoros in international competitions.

The country has featured an U16 national team which qualified for the 2013 FIBA Africa Under-16 Championship in Antananarivo, Madagascar.
The team's main player was Ahmed Ben Youssouf who averaged most minutes, points and steals for his team.  In 2021, he was with the French club BCM Gravelines-Dunkerque.

Competitions

FIBA Africa Championship
yet to qualify

References

External links
Comoros at FIBA site
Facebook presentation 

Men's national basketball teams
National sports teams of the Comoros